Kabondo Kasipul is a constituency in Kenya. It is one of eight constituencies in Homa Bay County.

Members 

 2022 - 13th Parliament - Eve Akinyi Obara - Orange Democratic Movement

References 

Constituencies in Homa Bay County